Vicki Sue Robinson (May 31, 1954 – April 27, 2000) was an American singer, closely associated with the disco era of late 1970s pop music; she is most famous for her 1976 hit, "Turn the Beat Around".

Early life
Born in Harlem, New York, to African American Shakespearean actor Bill Robinson and his European American wife Marianne, a folk singer, Vicki Sue Robinson was reared in Philadelphia, Pennsylvania, for most of her early years, returning with her family to New York City when she was ten.

Career
She gave her first public performance in 1960 at the age of six, when she accompanied her mother on stage at the Philadelphia Folk Festival. Ten years later, at the age of 16, while a student at the New Lincoln School, Robinson made her professional performing debut when she joined the Broadway cast of the musical Hair. Robinson remained with Hair for six weeks before moving to a new Broadway production, Soon, whose cast included Peter Allen, Barry Bostwick, Nell Carter and Richard Gere.

After the show's short run, Robinson appeared in the Off-Broadway play Long Time Coming, Long Time Gone, in which she and Richard Gere played Mimi and Richard Fariña. New York magazine opined that Robinson "sings with gentle power, accompanying herself on guitar and dulcimer, and moves with astounding confidence."

Robinson also had bit parts in the films Going Home (1971) and To Find A Man (1972). After a sojourn in Japan Robinson returned to Broadway in 1973, joining the cast of Jesus Christ Superstar.

Robinson made her recording debut as one of several Hair veterans invited to sing background on Todd Rundgren's Something/Anything? album released in 1972. In 1973 she spent time in Japan with Itsuro Shimoda, with whom she did session work on his album Love Songs and Lamentations and toured nationally.

In 2011, Gold Legion.com digitally remastered and reissued Robinson's four albums for RCA Records on CD along with bonus tracks and liner notes.

"Turn the Beat Around"
In 1975, Robinson was providing vocals at a New York recording session for the album Many Sunny Places by Scott Fagan, a singer with whom she had performed in Greenwich Village clubs. Warren Schatz, a producer/engineer with RCA Records, was struck by Robinson's voice and saw her potential as a disco-oriented artist. Schatz invited Robinson to cut some demos including a remake of the Foundations' "Baby Now That I've Found You" which became Robinson's first solo release. Despite that track's failure, RCA green-lit Schatz's producing Robinson's debut album Never Gonna Let You Go. The title cut, a Schatz original, became a #10 disco hit but another album track, "Turn the Beat Around", began to build "buzz" and was expediently released as a single, topping the disco charts on March 20, 1976. It reached the U.S. top 10 in August, spending around six months overall on the Billboard Hot 100 and propelling the Never Gonna Let You Go album to #49. "Turn the Beat Around" would chart internationally, reaching #14 in Canada, #11 in the Netherlands and #12 in South Africa. The track would earn Robinson a nomination for a Grammy Award for Best Female Pop Vocal Performance.

In 1976, Robinson toured across the United States promoting her hit tune, "Turn the Beat Around". She performed on major TV shows such as The Midnight Special, Don Kirshner's Rock Concert, The Merv Griffin Show, Mike Douglas, American Bandstand, and Soul Train. She also performed at the top venues around the country such as the Boarding House in San Francisco, The Starwood, in Los Angeles, The Bottom Line, Felt Forum, and Carnegie Hall in New York. The original touring band consisted of Dan Pickering on trumpet and flute, Bill Cerulli on drums, Wendy Simmons on bass guitar, Nacho Mena on percussion, Vernie "Butch" Taylor on guitar, and George Pavlis on keyboards. George Pavlis would be later replaced by Joey Melotti on keyboards. The touring band members recorded four tracks on Robinson's second album, Vicki Sue Robinson.

Follow-up
Again with Schatz producing, Robinson recorded Vicki Sue Robinson for release in the fall of 1976; although its lead single, a cover of Bobby Womack's "Daylight" was only a minor hit (#61), the album reached #45. Robinson's next Hot 100 appearance was in August 1977, with her version of David Gates' "Hold Tight", which peaked at #67 (and #2 on the disco chart). Its parent album, Half and Half, again produced by Schatz, was not released until 1978 and peaked at #110. In 1979, Robinson contributed the track "Easy to Be Hard" to the Schatz production Disco Spectacular – an album of dance versions of songs from the musical Hair inspired by the release of film version – and recorded what would prove to be her final album, Movin' On. Although Schatz was credited as the album's executive producer, that job was done by Evelyn King's producer, T. Life. Movin' On's tracks were ignored in the dance clubs, but Robinson scored a 1979 club hit with "Nighttime Fantasy", a track written and produced by Norman Bergen and Reid Whitelaw recorded for the film Nocturna: Granddaughter of Dracula. Also in 1979, Robinson appeared in a film made by the same production company as Nocturna: Granddaughter of Dracula titled Gangsters (now called Hoodlums), which also featured T. Life and Cissy Houston and the first credited screen role for Jean Smart.

The 1980s
In 1980 Robinson moved from RCA to Ariola Records, Warren Schatz having assumed the position of COO at Ariola. However Schatz did not continue as Robinson's producer at Ariola but respecting her wishes to move in a new musical direction he had her record at Muscle Shoals Sound Studios with Clayton Ivey and Terry Woodford producing the single "Nothin' But a Heartache", the recording of the Michael McDonald composition being Robinson's sole Ariola release. She subsequently resumed recording dance music with Schatz with releases on a number of labels: Prelude, Promise, Perfect and Profile, with the last-named releasing her dance version of "To Sir with Love", which became a surprise top ten hit in Australia in 1984. Robinson's next release, a remake of "Everlasting Love", in 1984 was her last recording for almost fifteen years, apart from the track "Grab Them Cakes", a duet with Junkyard Dog featured on The Wrestling Album (1985). "Grab Them Cakes" was issued as a single, with Cyndi Lauper miming the guitar in the music video.

Robinson sang background on Irene Cara's hit single "Fame" in 1980, and as the decade progressed she returned to session work, backing Michael Bolton and Cher. She also established herself as a career jingle singer for such products as Wrigley's Doublemint chewing gum, Maybelline Cosmetics, Downy fabric softener, Hanes underwear, New York Bell, and Folger's coffee. From 1987 to 1988, Robinson provided the singing voice for the characters Rapture and Minx in the animated TV series Jem.

Later career
Robinson regained some publicity from Gloria Estefan's 1994 version of "Turn the Beat Around". The success of the Estefan single inspired Robinson to re-record the song for the B-side of her 1995 single, "For Real". This led to TV appearances on a number of talk shows as well as some recording, film, and stage projects. Firstly, she provided backing vocals on RuPaul's 1996 album Foxy Lady, where the two of them also recorded a duet. Then, in 1997, she recorded the song "House of Joy" for DJ/producer Junior Vasquez, which became Robinson's first and only hit single in the United Kingdom. She then recorded the song "My Stomp, My Beat" for the film Chasing Amy. In October of that same year Robinson played herself on Comedy Central's mock TV documentary Unauthorized Biography: Milo, Death of a Supermodel. A resurgence of interest in disco music by the mid-1990s led Robinson, along with fellow disco veterans KC and the Sunshine Band, Thelma Houston, Gloria Gaynor and The Village People to embark on a well-received world tour.

Upon returning to the U.S. in 1999, Robinson returned to her roots in theatre by performing in an off-Broadway musical titled Vicki: Behind The Beat, which was semi-autobiographical in nature and featured her hit songs, along with her best-known jingles. The play was a continuation of her popular cabaret show. In June of that year she provided the track "Pokémon (Dance Mix)" from the Pokémon 2.B.A. Master soundtrack for the English dub of the Pokémon anime. Three months later, in September, Robinson released her final single, "Move On", which reached #18 on Billboard's Dance Chart. During that same month, she was forced to withdraw from her Off-Broadway show due to poor health. However, before her illness became terminal, Robinson undertook the role of a fairy godmother in the independent film Red Lipstick, which was released on April 16, 2000.

Death
On April 27, 2000, 11 days after the release of Red Lipstick, Robinson died of cancer at her home in Wilton, Connecticut.

Discography

Albums

Singles

Filmography
Going Home – 1971
To Find a Man – 1972
Hoodlums – 1980
Red Lipstick – 2000

Theatre
Hair – 1970
Soon – 1971
Long Time Coming, Long Time Gone – 1971
Voices From The Third World – 1972
Jesus Christ Superstar – 1973
Vicki Sue Robinson: Behind The Beat – 1999

See also
List of Billboard number-one dance club songs
List of artists who reached number one on the U.S. Dance Club Songs chart

Notes

References

External links
[ Vicki Sue Robinson Billboard Page]
Photograph of Robinson from the 1976 self-titled album cover

1954 births
2000 deaths
American women pop singers
20th-century African-American women singers
American disco musicians
American mezzo-sopranos
Prelude Records artists
American soul singers
Deaths from cancer in Connecticut
20th-century American singers
20th-century American women singers